Jorge Silva (born 19 June 1966) is a Brazilian boxer. He competed in the men's light middleweight event at the 1996 Summer Olympics.

References

1966 births
Living people
Brazilian male boxers
Olympic boxers of Brazil
Boxers at the 1996 Summer Olympics
Sportspeople from Recife
Light-middleweight boxers